The United Nations Information System on the Question of Palestine (UNISPAL) is an online collection  of texts of current and historical United Nations decisions and publications concerning the question of Palestine, the Israeli–Palestinian conflict and other issues related to the Middle East situation.

UNISPAL-Select contains a selection of the most important U.N. documents on these issues. The Special Focus section features documents on recent developments. The Supplement features non-U.N. documents on these issues.

See also

 Arab–Israeli conflict
 Israel and the United Nations
 Palestine and the United Nations

References

External links
 unispal.un.org, UNISPAL's official website

Israeli–Palestinian conflict and the United Nations
Organizations established by the United Nations
United Nations operations in the Middle East